Brigadier General Joseph Hatutale Kakoto is a retired  Namibian military officer who served as General Officer Commanding of the 4 Artillery Brigade. He retired on retired in January 2018.

Career
Bridadier General Kakoto went into exile joined the Peoples Liberation Army of Namibia in 1974 and served in various capacities. In 1990 he was a pioneer of the Namibian Defence Force. Rising through the ranks in the 2010s he was appointed as commandant of the Military School and in 2011 he was appointed as Chief of Staff Logistics at Defence Headquarters. After which he was transferred back to the Army and appointed as General Officer Commanding 4 artillery Brigade, he served in that capacity until his retirement in January 2018. He holds a Ph.D. in Business Administration from the Atlantic International University, United States.

Honours and decorations
  Namibian Army Pioneer Medal
  NDF Campaign Medal 
  NDF Commendation Medal

References

Living people
Namibian military personnel
People's Liberation Army of Namibia personnel
1958 births
Place of birth missing (living people)